The 1976–77 NBA season was the Spurs first season in the NBA. Months earlier, the Spurs were part of the American Basketball Association (Six in Dallas and three in San Antonio). The ABA had ended its ninth and last campaign. Of the seven remaining ABA teams, four joined the NBA: the Denver Nuggets, New York Nets, Indiana Pacers and San Antonio Spurs. The Kentucky Colonels and Spirits of St. Louis agreed to take a cash settlement and cease operations. Immediately, the ABA players were dispersed across the new 22-team league.  The other ABA teams from the prior season were all folded prior to the ABA–NBA merger: the Baltimore Claws, Utah Stars, San Diego Sails and Virginia Squires.

The Spurs made their debut on October 22 stunning the 76ers in Philadelphia by a score of 121–118. Afterwards, the Spurs would win just 1 of their next 7 games. In November, the Spurs would win 6 straight. By February the Spurs were 10 games over .500, and were the NBA's highest scoring team at 115 points per game.  Despite the offensive flash, the Spurs also had the league's worst defense at 114 points per game as they struggled to finish in 3rd place in the Central Division with a record of 44–38. In the playoffs, the Spurs were swept in 2 straight by the defending world champion Boston Celtics.

Offseason

NBA Draft
Neither the Spurs, Indiana Pacers, New York Nets or Denver Nuggets were allowed to participate in the 1976 NBA draft.

ABA Dispersal Draft
The American Basketball Association merged with the NBA in 1976. Of the teams remaining in the ABA, four joined the NBA.  The two teams, the Kentucky Colonels and Spirits of St. Louis, which folded had their players assigned to a dispersal draft for draft purposes.

Roster

Regular season

Season standings

Record vs. opponents

Game log

October
Record: 2–4; Home: 1–1; Road: 1–3

November
Record: 9–5; Home: 8–0; Road: 1–5

December
Record: 7–7; Home: 4–1; Road: 3–6

Playoffs

|- align="center" bgcolor="#ffcccc"
| 1
| April 12
| @ Boston
| L 94–104
| Kenon, Gervin (20)
| Billy Paultz (10)
| Louie Dampier (5)
| Boston Garden13,505
| 0–1
|- align="center" bgcolor="#ffcccc"
| 2
| April 15
| Boston
| L 109–113
| George Gervin (30)
| three players tied (7)
| Mike Gale (7)
| HemisFair Arena12,067
| 0–2
|-

Awards and records
George Gervin, All-NBA Second Team

References

Spurs on Basketball Reference

San Antonio Spurs seasons
San Antonio
San Antonio
San Antonio